The Derby 10k is an annual 10 kilometre road running event held in Derby, UK in April, organised by the Derby County Community Trust.

Over 3,000 runners take part in the race, which starts outside Pride Park Stadium, the home of Derby County F.C.

The course then loops around the Pride Park estate before heading over the Station Approach flyover and into Derby City Centre.

It continues through the city centre along St Peter's Street and Irongate and then heads out along Full St, Derwent St, Darwin Place, Eastgate and Chequers Rd before returning to the finish at Pride Park Stadium.

In 2012, a 3k Wheelchair race was held for the first time with the race won by local athlete Phil Hogg. A full 10k wheelchair race was held in 2014, which was again won by Phil Hogg.

The 2020 race was cancelled due to the COVID-19 outbreak. The 2021 event was switched to the autumn with the race held on 17 October 2021.

Winners 
Key: 

WHEELCHAIR RACE

Key:

External links 
Official Website
Derby Evening Telegraph: 2020 Derby 10k cancelled
Derby Evening Telegraph: Derby 10k 2019
Derby Evening Telegraph: Derby 10k 2018
BBC Derby: Derby 10k 2010
BBC Derby: Derby 10k 2009
BBC Derby: Derby 10k 2008
BBC Derby: Derby 10k 2007
BBC Derby: Derby 10k 2006
BBC Derby: Derby 10k 2005
BBC Derby: Derby 10k 2004
BBC Derby: Derby 10k 2003
Run Britain: Derby 10k 2018 results
Run Britain: Derby 10k 2017 results
Run Britain: Derby 10k 2016 results
Power of 10: Derby 10k 2015 results
Run Britain: Derby 10k 2014 results
Run Britain: Derby 10k 2013 results
Active Europe: Derby 10k 2012 results
Run Britain: Derby 10k 2011 results
Run Britain: Derby 10k 2010 results
Run Britain: Derby 10k 2009 results
Run Britain: Derby 10k 2008 results
Run Britain: Derby 20k 2007 results
The Power of 10: Derby 10k 2006 results
The Power of 10: Derby 10k 2005 results
The Power of 10: Derby 10k 2004 results
UK Results: Derby 10k 2002 results

Athletics competitions in England
Recurring sporting events established in 2002
2002 establishments in England
Sport in Derby